Lysons is a surname, and may refer to:

 Daniel Lysons (antiquarian), (1762–1834) English antiquary and topographer, brother of Samuel 
 Daniel Lysons (British Army officer),  (1816–1898) British Army general  
 Henry Lysons (1858–1907) British Colonel and recipient of the Victoria Cross
 Samuel Lysons, (1763–1819) English engraver and antiquary, brother of Daniel
 Canon Samuel Lysons, (1806–1877) antiquarian, son of Daniel, proponent of British Israelism
 Tom Lysons,  (1934–1997) provincial level politician from Alberta, Canada

See also
 Lyson